Soothing Sounds for Baby (1962) is a three-volume set of ambient electronic music by American composer, musician, and inventor Raymond Scott. Scott originally intended to lull infants to sleep with the music, but later generations have found value in the music for its minimalist aspects, often comparing it to the works of Brian Eno, Kraftwerk and Tangerine Dream despite having predated such artists by more than a decade.

Originally released in collaboration with the Gesell Institute of Human Development, the volumes are split up into three age groups: Volume 1 is 1 to 6 months; Volume 2 is 6 to 12 months; and Volume 3 is 12 to 18 months. The music gets more complex with each volume. Scott created much of the music on the albums with instruments he created, such as the Electronium and the Clavivox.  "Particularly on Soothing Sounds for Baby, Scott proved to be one of the first composers to merge the Brave New World of electronic sounds with a rhythmic pop sensibility."  Basta Music of Holland reissued the albums as 3 individual CDs and as a 3-LP box set in 1997.

In 2017, Music On Vinyl in cooperation with Basta Music pressed a limited edition of 1,000 copies on silver-coloured vinyl.

Notes

External links 
 Soothing Sounds for Baby at raymondscott.com archive

Ambient albums by American artists
1962 compilation albums
Children's music albums
Raymond Scott albums
Epic Records albums